Perfecto Presents: The Club is the seventeenth DJ mix album by British DJ and electronic music producer Paul Oakenfold, released by Thrive Records in 2005. It is the twelfth instalment in his Perfecto Presents series, a series of DJ mix albums themed around Oakenfold's label Perfecto Records.

Oakenfold uses back one of his old alias, Perfecto Allstarz, in this album.

Critical reception 
David Jeffries of Allmusic rated the album three stars out of five, saying "Oakenfold isn't "working the wheels of steel" as much as just sequencing the songs in an order that makes dramatic sense, but he does blend a couple of the tracks rather nicely."

Track listing
Perfecto Allstarz - "Psycho"
Faultline featuring The Flaming Lips - "The Colossal Gray Sunshine" (Paul Oakenfold Remix)
Perfecto Allstarz - "Bullit" (Long)
Natasha Bedingfield - "If You're Gonna Jump" (Paul Oakenfold Remix)
The Doors - "L.A. Woman" (Paul Oakenfold Remix)
Justin Timberlake - "Rock Your Body" (Paul Oakenfold Remix)
Oakenfold - "Southern Sun"
U2- "Beautiful Day" (The Perfecto Remix)
PPK - "ResuRection"
Jan Johnston - "Delirium"
Deadly Avenger - "Artisan"
Perfecto Allstarz - "Chroma" (Long)
Perfecto Allstarz - "The Club Theme"

References 

Paul Oakenfold compilation albums
2005 compilation albums